Camenabologue at , is the 55th–highest peak in Ireland on the Arderin scale, and the 71st–highest peak on the Vandeleur-Lynam scale.  Camenabologue is situated in the southern section of the Wicklow Mountains, and has a subsidiary summit, Camenabologue SE Top  . Camenabologue forms a horseshoe on a "boggy" massif, at the head of Glenmalure, with its neighbours, that include Table Mountain , and Conavalla .  Camenabologue also sits on the main "central spine" of the Wicklow mountains and links to the larger massif of Lugnaquilla , which lies at the southern terminus of the whole range.

Camenabologue's prominence of  does not qualify it as a Marilyn, but it does rank it as the 31st-highest mountain in Ireland on the MountainViews Online Database, 100 Highest Irish Mountains, where the minimum prominence threshold is 100 metres.

Bibliography

See also
Wicklow Way
Wicklow Round
Wicklow Mountains
Lists of mountains in Ireland
List of mountains of the British Isles by height
List of Hewitt mountains in England, Wales and Ireland

References

External links
MountainViews: The Irish Mountain Website, Camenabologue
MountainViews: Irish Online Mountain Database
The Database of British and Irish Hills , the largest database of British Isles mountains ("DoBIH")
Hill Bagging UK & Ireland, the searchable interface for the DoBIH

Mountains and hills of County Wicklow
Hewitts of Ireland
Mountains under 1000 metres